is a Japanese manga series written by Iku Sakaguchi and illustrated by Shiuri Iwasawa. The story follows Motoko Gettou, a normal female high school student, with a not so normal secret. When she was a child she was trained by her three martial artist fathers. Subjected to excessive physical and mental training, Motoko developed three distinct split-personalities known as Hibiki, Fujiko, and Mikiri. Collectively they refer to themselves as HiFuMi. Each individually skilled gained a mastery in combat skills learned from each of her fathers. As Motoko tries to live a normal high-school life she only seems to find herself in the most awkward situations, courtesy of HiFuMi.

Plot

Change 123 follows Kosukegawa Teruharu, a justice-loving fan of Kamen Raider (a parody of Kamen Rider) and Gettou Motoko, a teenage girl experiencing multiple personality disorder. Orphaned at an early age after the death of her mother, she was taken in by her three fathers, each of whom is a master of a certain style of martial arts or combat-training. Under the care of each parent, Motoko's childhood was subjected to excessively rigorous training, straining her to the point that she developed three split-personalities, Hibiki, Fujiko, and Mikiri, colloquially known as HiFuMi. Each personality is individually skilled in combat skills learned from each master, thus also shaping their personalities. Kosukegawa happens to witness Hibiki ruthlessly kick a perverted man when a shocked Motoko promises Kosukegawa she will do anything if he doesn't reveal her secret. They quickly become friends and Kosukegawa develops romantic feelings for all of Motoko's personalities, and vice versa. However, Motoko feels that something must be done with the personalities as her seemingly unconscious acts of violence cannot be continued, thus she and Kosukegawa set off to supposedly rid of her dormant anger and fuse her personalities into one being.

Release
Change 123 was published in Akita Shoten's seinen magazine Champion Red from June 2005 to June 2010. A total of 12 tankōbon chapter-collection volumes were published in Japan from September 20, 2005 to July 5, 2010. In addition, a drama CD based on the manga has been released.

Reception

References

External links
 Change 1 2 3  at Animeland 
 Change 123 at Manga News 
 Change 123 at Manga Sanctuary 
 Change Hi Fu Mi at Planète BD 
 

2005 manga
Action anime and manga
Akita Shoten manga
Comedy anime and manga
Dissociative identity disorder in popular culture
Martial arts anime and manga
Romance anime and manga
Seinen manga